David MacLaren may refer to:

David Laurence MacLaren (1893–1960), Canadian politician
Dave MacLaren (1934–2016), footballer

See also
David McLaren (disambiguation)